The siege of Jerusalem (597 BC) was a military campaign carried out by Nebuchadnezzar II, king of the Neo-Babylonian Empire, in which he besieged Jerusalem, then capital of the Kingdom of Judah. The city surrendered, with king Jeconiah of Judah deported to Babylon and replaced by his Babylonian-appointed uncle, Zedekiah. The siege was recorded by both the Hebrew Bible and the Babylonian Nebuchadnezzar Chronicle.

In 601 BC, Nebuchadnezzar unsuccessfully attempted to take Egypt and was repulsed with heavy losses. Jehoiakim king of Judah seized the opportunity to revolt against Babylonian rule, taking a pro-Egyptian position, despite the strong remonstrances of the prophet Jeremiah. Jehoiakim died for reasons unclear, and was succeeded by his young son, Jeconiah.

The Babylonians besieged Jerusalem, and in March 597 BC the city surrendered. Jeconiah, his court and other prominent citizens and craftsmen, were deported to Babylon. This event is considered to be the start of Babylonian captivity and of the Jewish Diaspora. Jeconiah's uncle, Zedekiah, was installed as vassal king of Judah.

A decade later, Zedekiah launched another rebellion against the Babylonians, which was brutally crushed by Nebuchadnezzar. In 587 BC, a second siege of Jerusalem culminated in the destruction of the city and First Temple, bringing an end to the Kingdom of Judah.

Dating
The Babylonian Chronicles, which were published by Donald Wiseman in 1956, establish that Nebuchadnezzar captured Jerusalem the first time on March 16, 597 BC. Before Wiseman's publication, E. R. Thiele had determined from the biblical texts that Nebuchadnezzar's initial capture of Jerusalem occurred in the spring of 597 BC, but other scholars, including William F. Albright, more frequently dated the event to 598 BC.

Siege
To avoid the destruction of Jerusalem, King Jehoiakim of Judah, in his third year, changed his allegiance from Egypt to Babylon. He paid tribute from the treasury in Jerusalem, and Nebuchadnezzar took some temple artifacts and some of the royal family and nobility as hostages. In 601 BC, during the fourth year of his reign, Nebuchadnezzar unsuccessfully attempted to invade Egypt and was repulsed with heavy losses. The failure led to numerous rebellions among the states of the Levant which owed allegiance to Babylon, including Judah, where King Jehoiakim stopped paying tribute to Nebuchadnezzar and took a pro-Egyptian position.

Nebuchadnezzar soon dealt with these rebellions. According to the Nebuchadnezzar Chronicle, he laid siege to Jerusalem, which eventually fell in 597 BC. The Chronicle states:

In the seventh year [of Nebuchadnezzar, 598 BC] in the month Chislev [November/December] the king of Babylon assembled his army, and after he had invaded the land of Hatti (Syria/Palestine) he laid siege to the city of Judah. On the second day of the month of Adar [16 March] he conquered the city and took the king [Jeconiah] prisoner. He installed in his place a king [Zedekiah] of his own choice, and after he had received rich tribute, he sent forth to Babylon.

Jehoiakim died during the siege, possibly on December 10, 598 BC, or during the months of Kislev, or Tevet. Nebuchadnezzar pillaged the city and its Temple, and the new king Jeconiah, who was either 8 or 18, and his court and other prominent citizens and craftsmen, were deported to Babylon. The deportation occurred prior to Nisan of 597 BC, and dates in the Book of Ezekiel are counted from that event.

Nebuchadnezzar installed Jeconiah's uncle, Zedekiah as puppet-king of Judah, and Jeconiah was compelled to remain in Babylon. The start of Zedekiah's reign has been variously dated within a few weeks before, or after  the start of Nisan 597 BC.

The Book of Kings (written in the 7th and 6th centuries BC) records that 10,000 people were exiled during this time, also adding 7,000 craftsmen and 1,000 "smiths", bringing the total to 18,000. Comparatively, the Book of Jeremiah mentions 3,023 people taken into captivity. Some scholars have argued whether this number includes only men. If this is true, perhaps as many as 15,000 to 30,000 Judeans were exiled.

References

External links

 The Siege on the Encyclopædia Britannica website
 The Chronicle Concerning the Early Years of Nebuchadnezzar II 

597
597 BC
6th century BC in the Kingdom of Judah
Jerusalem
Jerusalem
Jerusalem
Nebuchadnezzar II
Wars of ancient Israel